The 1990 NCAA Skiing Championships were contested at the Stowe Mountain Resort in Stowe, Vermont as the 37th annual NCAA-sanctioned ski tournament to determine the individual and team national champions of men's and women's collegiate slalom and cross-country skiing in the United States.

Defending champions Vermont, coached by Chip LaCasse, claimed their third team national championship, finishing 100 points ahead of Utah in the cumulative team standings.

Venue

This year's NCAA skiing championships were hosted at the Stowe Mountain Resort in Stowe, Vermont

These were the sixth championships held in the state of Vermont (1955, 1961, 1973, 1980, 1986, and 1990) and third at Stowe (1980, 1986, and 1990).

Program

Men's events
 Cross country, 10 kilometer classical
 Cross country, 20 kilometer freestyle
 Slalom
 Giant slalom

Women's events
 Cross country, 5 kilometer classical
 Cross country, 15 kilometer freestyle
 Slalom
 Giant slalom

Team scoring

 DC – Defending champions

See also
 List of NCAA skiing programs

References

1990 in sports in Vermont
NCAA Skiing Championships
NCAA Skiing Championships
1990 in alpine skiing
1990 in cross-country skiing